Edward Stanley (1790 – 19 August 1863) was a British Conservative and Tory politician.

Stanley was elected Tory Member of Parliament for West Cumberland at the 1832 general election and, becoming a Conservative in 1834, held the seat until 1852 when he did not seek re-election.

References

External links
 

UK MPs 1832–1835
UK MPs 1835–1837
UK MPs 1837–1841
UK MPs 1847–1852
UK MPs 1841–1847
Tory MPs (pre-1834)
Conservative Party (UK) MPs for English constituencies
1790 births
1863 deaths